Olivecrona is a surname. Notable people with the surname include:

 Karl Olivecrona (1897–1980), Swedish lawyer, brother of Herbert
 Herbert Olivecrona (1891–1980), Swedish neurosurgeon, brother of Karl
 Rosalie Roos Olivecrona (1823–1898), Swedish feminist activist and writer, wife of Swedish lawyer Knut Olivecrona